Fereydoun Kian was an Iranian military officer with regular military (Artesh) background who served as the acting commander of the Islamic Revolutionary Guard Corps for a short period of time in late 1979, during its early formative phase.

References

Islamic Republic of Iran Army colonels
Islamic Revolutionary Guard Corps officers